Rheem, California may refer to:
 Rheem, California, unincorporated community
 Rheem, San Pablo, California, neighborhood
 Rheem, former name of Moraga, California